The Ridgefield School District is a comprehensive community public school district that serves students in pre-kindergarten through twelfth grade from the Borough of Ridgefield, in Bergen County, New Jersey, United States.

As of the 2018–19 school year, the district, comprising four schools, had an enrollment of 1,480 students and 158.7 classroom teachers (on an FTE basis), for a student–teacher ratio of 9.3:1.

The district is classified by the New Jersey Department of Education as being in District Factor Group "DE", the fourth-lowest of eight groupings. District Factor Groups organize districts statewide to allow comparison by common socioeconomic characteristics of the local districts. From lowest socioeconomic status to highest, the categories are A, B, CD, DE, FG, GH, I and J.

The district offers a wide variety of opportunities for students of all abilities to grow academically, socially, and emotionally, including a special education magnet school. Since the early 1990s, the District has served special needs youngsters from Ridgefield and from other districts in a state-recognized program, using learning centers at all four schools.

Ridgefield's Academic Decathlon team consistently places among regional and state competitions. The district's schools offer a full range of athletics at all levels.

Schools
Schools in the district (with 2018–19 enrollment from the National Center for Education Statistics) are:
Elementary schools
Shaler Academy and Bergen Boulevard School with 191 students in grades PreK/K and 196 students in grades 1-2
Dr. Tamika S. DePass, Principal
Slocum-Skewes School with 771 students in grades 3-8
Timothy Yang, Principal
High school
Ridgefield Memorial High School with 514 students in grades 9-12
Janet Seabold, Principal

Administration
Core members of the district's administration are:
Dr. Rory McCourt, Superintendent of Schools
Julyana Ortiz, Business Administrator / Board Secretary

Board of education
The district's board of education, with nine members, sets policy and oversees the fiscal and educational operation of the district through its administration. As a Type II school district, the board's trustees are elected directly by voters to serve three-year terms of office on a staggered basis, with three seats up for election each year held (since 2012) as part of the November general election. The board appoints a superintendent to oversee the day-to-day operation of the district.

References

External links
Ridgefield School District
 
School Data for the Ridgefield School District, National Center for Education Statistics

Ridgefield, New Jersey
New Jersey District Factor Group DE
School districts in Bergen County, New Jersey